The 2021 Constitutional Democratic Party of Japan leadership election took place on 30 November 2021 to elect the next president of the Constitutional Democratic Party of Japan after the inaugural leader of the party, Yukio Edano, announced his intention to resign as party leader citing the party's poor performance in the 2021 general election.

Background
Founded in October 2017 as a split from the Democratic Party, the Constitutional Democratic Party of Japan achieved the status of the opposition's largest force after the 2017 general election, when it became the second largest party in the Diet, with 55 seats in the House of Representatives. In September 2020, the party was re-established following a merger with most of the DPP and SDP caucuses, and some independent lawmakers. After the merger, the number of seats rose to 110. 

In order to increase the weight of the opposition, the CDP decided to establish joint candidacies with three other progressive parties (JCP, SDP and Reiwa Shinsengumi) in most of the electoral districts for the 2021 general election.
Although the cooperation strategy and a slight increase in votes for the party had led to an increase in the seats obtained compared to 2017 (from 55 to 96), these were still inferior to the number of seats held by the party before the vote (110). Furthermore, the majority of polls predicted better results for the CDP. Therefore, Yukio Edano decided to step down, so that a new leadership could reorganize the party in view of the elections for the Upper House in the summer of 2022.

Timeline

2021
 2 November – Yukio Edano announces his resignation as party president. 
 13 November – Party officials announce the election will be held on 30 November 2021.
 17 November - Kenta Izumi, Seiji Osaka and Chinami Nishimura announced their candidacies.
 18 November - Junya Ogawa announced his candidacy.
 19 November – Campaign officially began. 
 22 November – The first of three public debate between the leadership candidates was held.
 30 November - The leadership election was held, in which Kenta Izumi won.

Candidates

Declined
Hiroshi Ogushi, member of the House of Representatives for Saga 2nd district; former member of the House of Representatives for Kyushu PR (2005–2009; 2012–2017) (endorsed Ogawa)

Results
An extraordinary party convention was held at a hotel in Tokyo on the afternoon of November 30th. Following the announcement of the results of the "local vote" by local lawmakers, party members and supporters, which was closed on the 29th, parliamentarians and prospective official candidates voted. 

From the first round of the vote, Izumi was 1st (189 points), Osaka was 2nd (148 points), Ogawa was 3rd (133 points), and Nishimura was 4th (102 points). None of the four candidates reached the majority of 572 votes in total, so Izumi and Osaka advanced to the final vote of the top two. As a result of a final vote by a member of parliament, prospective official candidate, and representatives from 47 prefectures, Izumi, who got 205 points, defeated Osaka, who got 128 points, and was elected as the new leader of the party.

References

Elections in Japan
Next Constitutional Democratic Party of Japan
2021 elections in Japan
November 2021 events in Japan